1941 Academy Awards may refer to:

 13th Academy Awards, the Academy Awards ceremony that took place in 1941
 14th Academy Awards, the 1942 ceremony honoring the best in film for 1941